Shrawardine is a small village in the civil parish of Montford. It is  outside Shrewsbury, the county town of Shropshire, England.

Etymology
Its name is locally pronounced Shray-den, and was often spelt "Shraydon" in old documents; it is otherwise pronounced Shray-war-dine. The placename originates from Old English worðign "enclosed settlement" combined with either scraef "cave"  or screawa "shrew", the latter used as a byname for an individual.

Landmarks
The village's landmarks include Shrawardine Castle and St Mary's Church. The castle, known as Castell Isabella by the Anglo-Normans, was built in the reign of Henry I of England, and dismantled during the English Civil War in 1645. It had been held since 1644 by the Royalist commander Sir William Vaughan, whose aggressive tactics earned him the nickname "the Devil of Shrawardine".

Little Shrawardine
The River Severn passes to the west of the village. On the other side of the river is a hamlet called Little Shrawardine. It lies mainly within the civil parish of Montford.

Notable residents
Rev Dr Nevil Maskelyne FRS FRSE , the fifth Astronomer Royal, was Rector of the parish 1775 to 1782.
Jane Gray (stained glass artist) has had a workshop in Shrawardine since 1992.

See also
Listed buildings in Montford, Shropshire

References

External links

Villages in Shropshire